John Stauffer may refer to:

John Stauffer (politician) (1925–2019), American politician
John Stauffer (professor), American academic
John Stauffer Sr., co-founder of Stauffer Chemical